"Can't Stop the River" is a song written by Seal and Peter Gordeno, and was originally recorded in 2006 by Louise Setara. After Duncan James' version was released first commercially in June 2006, Setara's version was then released a few months later as her debut single. The song appears on her debut album, Still Waters released in September 2006.

Duncan James version

Duncan James recorded his version of the song, retitled "Can't Stop a River", and it was released on 21 August 2006 as the second single from his debut solo album, Future Past. The song peaked at number 59 on the UK Singles Chart.

Track listing
UK CD single
 "Can't Stop a River" – 3:52
 "You Can" – 3:55

UK CD single 2
 "Can't Stop a River" – 3:52
 "Part Time Love" – 4:03
 "Simple Love Song" – 3:14
 "Can't Stop a River" (Video) – 3:52
 "Can't Stop a River" (Behind the Scenes) – 2:00

Charts

Other versions
Guy Sebastian recorded the song for his 2006 album Closer to the Sun.

References

2006 debut singles
Duncan James songs
Guy Sebastian songs
Song recordings produced by Stephen Lipson
Songs written by Seal (musician)
Songs written by Peter Gordeno (musician)
2006 songs